

See also
 European KF1 Championship

European Kf1 Championship, 2008